Boys Night Out is the third full-length album from Canadian emo/post-hardcore band Boys Night Out. It was released on June 26, 2007, their third and final release on Ferret Records.

Release
On June 15, 2007, the music video for "Up With Me" was posted on the band's Myspace profile. Three days later, "Get Your Head Straight" was posted online. On June 19, 2007, Boys Night Out was made available for streaming, before being released seven days later. In July 2007, they went on an East Coast tour with support from Emanuel, June, and Olympia. In September and October 2007, the band went on a cross-country Canadian tour, followed by a trek to Australia.

Track listing
"Get Your Head Straight" - 2:49
"Swift and Unforgiving" - 3:42
"The Push and Pull" - 3:43
"Up With Me" - 3:52
"The Heirs of Error" - 2:52
"Let Me Be Your Swear Word" - 3:40
"Hey, Thanks" - 3:39
"Fall for the Drinker" - 3:45
"Apartment 4" - 3:51
"Reason Ain't Our Long Suit" - 3:44
"It Won't Be Long" - 5:35

B-Sides
"Hints of Acquiescence"

Music videos
Up With Me

Personnel
Connor Lovat-Fraser – lead vocals, lyrics
Jeff Tarbender Davis – guitars, vocals
Andy Lewis – guitars
Dave Costa – bass
Ben Arseneau – drums, percussion

References

External links

Boys Night Out at YouTube (streamed copy where licensed)
Official Band Website
Ferret Records

2007 albums
Boys Night Out (band) albums
Ferret Music albums
Albums produced by Lou Giordano